Wayne Froman was an American actor who worked extensively in Australia, in particularly on radio. He also appeared on stage and in the film South West Pacific.

He had worked as a comedian in New York when he arrived in Australia in late 1939 to appear in Ziegfeld Follies.

In July 1945 he, along with a number of other actors, was banned for three months from radio for broadcasting "objectionable matter".

References

External links
Select Australian theatre credits at AusStage

American male radio actors
20th-century American male actors
American male musical theatre actors
Place of birth missing
Year of birth missing